In mortgages, refinancing burnout is the tendency for prepayments to drop after rates fall, rise, and fall again. In other words, when interest rates keep on dropping, those who can benefit by taking advantages of refinancing will have done so already when rates declined in previous periods and this prepayment behavior is called refinancing burnout.

References
 Collateralized Mortgage Obligations: Structures and Analysis by Frank Fabozzi
 Pricing Mortgage backed securities using prepayment functions and pathwise Monte Carlo Simulation by Osman Acheampong
 Bond Portfolio Management by Frank Fabozzi
  http://www.investopedia.com/terms/b/burnout.asp

Mortgage industry of the United States